Igrot Kodesh (literally "Holy Epistles" but more commonly known as "Letters of the Rebbe") is a collection of correspondence and responses of the seventh Rebbe of Chabad-Lubavitch, Menachem Mendel Schneerson.

It is modeled after Igrot Kodesh Maharayatz which are the letters of the sixth Rebbe of Lubavitch, Yosef Yitzchok Schneersohn. The topics considered in these letters include many realms of discussion, and numerous disciplines of human pursuit. Its purview encompassing philosophy (be it Talmudic, Halachic, Hasidic, mystical or other), scientific matters, global events, counsel in private issues, schooling, and social/communal proceedings.

There is a practice among many Jews, particularly within members of Chabad-Lubavitch, to use the Igrot Kodesh to ask advice from the Rebbe.

References

External links 
 Online text of the Igrot Kodesh {Hebrew or Yiddish, depending on the volume}
 Possibility to write to the Rebbe via Igrot Kodesh online

Chabad-Lubavitch texts
Books by Menachem Mendel Schneerson